Guangyuan Panlong Airport  is an airport serving Guangyuan, Sichuan province, China.

Airlines and destinations

See also
 List of airports in China

References

Airports in Sichuan